The Finnish Trade Union Federation (SAJ) was a national trade union centre in Finland.

The federation was established in 1960, as a split from the Finnish Federation of Trade Unions (SAK), by unions which supported the Social Democratic Party of Finland.  By 1968, the federation had 17 affiliates, but a total of only 95,166 members.  In 1969, it merged with the SAK, to form the Central Organisation of Finnish Trade Unions.

Affiliates
The following unions held membership of the federation for some period:

References

National trade union centers of Finland
1960 establishments in Finland
Trade unions established in 1960
1969 disestablishments in Finland
Trade unions disestablished in 1969